Carenum habitans is a species of ground beetle in the subfamily Scaritinae. It was described by Sloane in 1890.

References

habitans
Beetles described in 1890